is a Japanese footballer currently playing as a winger for Sagan Tosu.

Career statistics

Club
.

Notes

References

1999 births
Living people
Association football people from Saitama Prefecture
Ryutsu Keizai University alumni
Japanese footballers
Association football midfielders
J1 League players
Urawa Red Diamonds players
Sagan Tosu players